PNDS may refer to:

 Nigerien Party for Democracy and Socialism (Parti Nigerien pour la Democratie et le Socialisme), a political party in Niger
 Paraneoplastic neurological disorder
 Persistent Neurodevelopmental Stuttering, associated with the human gene NAGPA
 Post nasal drip syndrome, a disorder that occurs when excessive mucus is produced by the nasal mucosa

See also
 PND (disambiguation)